Kim Sun-joo (born November 13, 1985) is an alpine skier from South Korea.  She competed for South Korea at the 2010 Winter Olympics.   Her best result was a 46th place in the slalom.

References

External links
 
 
 
 

1985 births
Living people
South Korean female alpine skiers
Olympic alpine skiers of South Korea
Alpine skiers at the 2010 Winter Olympics
Asian Games medalists in alpine skiing
Alpine skiers at the 2007 Asian Winter Games
Alpine skiers at the 2011 Asian Winter Games
Asian Games gold medalists for South Korea
Asian Games bronze medalists for South Korea
Medalists at the 2007 Asian Winter Games
Medalists at the 2011 Asian Winter Games
21st-century South Korean women